Dunster House is one of twelve undergraduate residential Houses at Harvard University. Built in 1930, it is one of the first two dormitories at Harvard University constructed under President Abbott Lawrence Lowell's House Plan and one of the seven Houses given to Harvard by Edward Harkness. In the early days, room rents varied based on the floor and the size of the room.  Dunster was unique among Harvard dormitories for its sixth-story walk-up (it had no elevators); these rooms were originally rented by poorer students, such as Norman Mailer.

The House was named in honor of Henry Dunster, the first President of Harvard University.

History
The tower of Dunster House is inspired by, but somewhat smaller than, the famous Tom Tower of Christ Church, Oxford. Above the east wing is the Dunster family coat of arms, and above the west wing is the coat of arms of Magdalene College, Cambridge, where Henry Dunster matriculated in 1627.  Magdalene College commemorated the relationship between the two universities by sending medieval tracery stones from the First Court of Magdalene; these are now set in the wall near the doors to J-entry of Dunster House. 

Dunster is located on the banks of the Charles River next to the John W. Weeks Footbridge, which links Harvard's Allston and Cambridge campuses. From above, its architectural shape, unusual among the River Houses, resembles a branching flowchart due to the odd trapezoidal footprint of the land on which it was built.  Dunster underwent a "full House renewal," a comprehensive renovation that was completed in 2016.  It was the first of Harvard's residential houses to undergo such a full renewal. 

Dunster, like many of the Harvard Houses, has many yearly traditions, including Keg Races in the fall, Messiah sing-a-long in the winter, the Goat Roast in the spring, and the yearly Dunster House Opera.  It is known as one of the more social houses at Harvard, boasting popular Stein Clubs and formals in either the beautiful dining hall or courtyard.

As of the 2017-2018 academic year, Dunster's Faculty Deans (formerly known as "house masters") are Sean Kelly and Cheryl Chen. The House's first master was Chester N. Greenough (Harvard Class of 1898), English Professor and former Dean of Harvard College.  Former faculty deans/house masters include Roger Porter and Ann Porter, Raoul Bott, and Sally Falk Moore and Cresap Moore.  Michael Uy currently serves as the Allston Burr Resident Dean.  His predecessor was Carlos E. Diaz Rosillo.

Dunster's mascot is the moose, inspired by the three golden elk on the Dunster family crest.

Notable alumni

Al Gore and Tommy Lee Jones were roommates at Dunster House in the late 1960s. Other notable Dunster alumni include Tatyana Ali, Christopher Durang, Lindsay Hyde, Dan Wilson, and Jean Kwok. In 1995 resident Sinedu Tadesse killed her roommate Trang Ho in Dunster before committing suicide in a closet.

Notes

External links
 Dunster House official site

Harvard Houses
University and college dormitories in the United States
Houses completed in 1930
Clock towers in Massachusetts